The 2015–16 season was the 84th season in Granada history and the 22nd in the top-tier.

Players

Current squad

Out on loan

Competitions

Overall

Overview

La Liga

League table

Results summary

Result round by round

Matches

See also
 2015–16 La Liga

External links
Club's official website

Granada CF seasons
Granada CF